Ruffus the Dog (stylized as RuFFuS T H E  D O G) is a Canadian children's television series which aired on YTV from 1998 to 1999; it was created by Robert Mills and developed with Cheryl Wagner.  The show was produced through Radical Sheep Productions, a company founded by Robert Mills in 1985 that also created The Big Comfy Couch. The Ruffus character had previously appeared in the educational video series The Adventures of Ruffus & Andy in the early 1990s, as produced by the Credit Valley Hospital in Mississauga, Ontario, where Ruffus and his owner Andy learned medical lessons.

When Robert Mills left Radical Sheep in 2002, ownership and rights to the award-winning series were transferred to his new company, Hunky Dorey Entertainment. Mills, who also performs the title role of Ruffus, is now distributing the original series and subsequent new works online.  The first major production was a re-telling of the Charles Dickens classic A Christmas Carol with Ruffus playing Scrooge.

Currently, the Ruffus Project is embarking on production of a new web series entitled: Ruffus The Dog's Steampunk Adventure.

Also in the works are a series of illustrated book titles and a pre-school web series entitled: Ruffus Rhymes.

Synopsis
Ruffus the Dog runs a bookshop in a small town. There, he reads a famous fairy tale to the viewers. In the story, Ruffus and several other characters portray different characters in the tale. At the end, he tells about the moral of the story to the viewers.

Episodes

External links
 
 Ruffus the Dog
 Case Study of the series by Creative Commons

1990s Canadian children's television series
1998 Canadian television series debuts
1999 Canadian television series endings
Canadian television shows featuring puppetry
Creative Commons-licensed podcasts
YTV (Canadian TV channel) original programming
Television shows about dogs
Television series by Radical Sheep Productions